Matthew Morgan is a British gentleman comedy writer, actor, DJ and radio presenter.

He is best known for his work with Russell Brand, with whom he shared numerous writing credits, as well as co-hosting The Russell Brand Show on BBC Radio 2, BBC 6 Music and Radio X.

Career

Writing 
Morgan met Russell Brand when he was working as an intern on MTV. He first joined with Brand after the presenter told him he had a television show idea which was "good" and "commissioned", and that Morgan should work on it with him; Morgan later joked that neither of those things turned out to be true. In 2010 Matt wrote and co-performed Borked TV with comedian Rufus Hound and others, a six-part series featuring comedy voiceovers dubbed over existing television material.

Radio 
Morgan was the co-host of The Russell Brand Show from its initial conception in 2006 on BBC 6 Music until its finish after Brand's resignation due to the prank telephone calls row. On the radio show, Morgan played the straight man to Brand's cheeky chappy persona, often mimicking Brand's Dot Cotton-esque accent and singing. In his memoir, Booky Wook 2, Brand asserted that he and Morgan got into a row following Brand's controversial turn as the host of the 2008 MTV Video Music Awards (which the men co-wrote), and Morgan refused to return to the show.

When Brand returned to talk radio in the Autumn of 2010, Morgan rejoined The Russell Brand Show. In September 2011, Morgan joined Noel Gallagher in co-hosting a show filling in for Dermot O'Leary.

In March 2013, Morgan, along with Brand, Gallagher and Mr Gee, hosted a one-off radio show on XFM in aid of Teenage Cancer Trust.

Morgan reunited with Brand and Mr Gee for The Russell Brand Podcast, which began in February 2015 on audioBoom.

In February 2016, Morgan reunited with Gallagher for a one-off radio show for Absolute Radio.

In April 2017, Morgan reunited with Russell Brand and Greg "Mr Gee" Sekweyama for a new show on Radio X. The initial contract was for a length of 6 months. Matt also covered Johnny Vaughan on drive, co-hosting with Gordon Smart, in late February 2019 and again in May of the same year. He also co-hosted with Smart on Radio X in June, August and October 2019.

From 8 to 22 August 2021, Morgan along with Gallagher presented "The Radio X Residency" every Sunday 7pm to 9pm throughout on Radio X.

Internet 
In 2014, Morgan appeared as a guest commentator on Brand's YouTube web series The Trews on 23 July, 24 July and 8 August.

In 2020, Morgan launched a podcast titled Matt Morgan's Funny How?. Guests have included Joe Lycett and Noel Gallagher, and the podcast has since migrated to Patreon.

Morgan is personal friends with Noel Gallagher and the pair have ventured in a number of interviews on YouTube. Gallagher has also appeared in Matt Morgan's Funny How multiple times during 2020.

Podcast
The Matt Morgan Podcast is a weekly podcast hosted by Matt Morgan. The podcast primarily consists of interviews with comedians and comedy writers, as well as Matt answering questions from Patreon subscribers and telling stories from his life.

The Matt Morgan Podcast was first released in January 2020 as free podcast entitled Matt Morgans Funny How?. After 20 episodes the Podcast moved to a Patreon only subscription base and was renamed The Matt Morgan Podcast.

Credits

Writing credits 
 RE:Brand (2002)
 Empire Square (2005)
 1 Leicester Square (2006)
 Russell Brand's Got Issues (2006)
 The Russell Brand Show (2006)
 The Kevin Bishop Show (2008)
 James Corden's World Cup Live (2010)
 Borked TV (The 5:19 Show) (2010)
 The Fun Police (2011)
 Cardinal Burns (2012)
 Very Important People (2012)
 The Mimic  (2014)
 Sam Delaney's News Thing (2016)
 Morgana Robinson's The Agency (2016)
 Plebs (2016)
 Murder in Successville (2017)
 Hospital People (2017)
  Mister Winner  (2020)

Presenting 
 Russell Brand on the Road

Other roles 
 Russell Brand's Ponderland (2007–2008) – Creative Director

References

External links 
 

English male comedians
English radio personalities
English television writers
Living people
British male television writers
Year of birth missing (living people)